Ngome is a flatbread made in Mali using only millet, water and vegetable oil. The millet is typically home-ground and coarse.

References

External links
 Includes the author's recipe for ngome bread.

Flatbreads
Unleavened breads
Malian cuisine